Splendrillia elongata is a species of sea snail, a marine gastropod mollusk in the family Drilliidae.

Homonymy
The extinct species Splendrillia elongata Beu, 1980, and the extant species Splendrillia elongata Wells, 1995, are homonyms, but not synonyms. A replacement name will have to be established for the junior name

Description

Distribution
This marine species occurs off New Caledonia.

References

 Wells, Fred E. "A revision of the drilliid genera Splendrillia and Plagiostropha (Gastropoda: Conoidea) from New Caledonia, with additional records from other areas." Mémoires du Muséum national d'histoire naturelle 167 (1995): 527–556.

External links
  Tucker, J.K. 2004 Catalog of recent and fossil turrids (Mollusca: Gastropoda). Zootaxa 682:1-1295.
 Holotype at MNHN, paris

elongata